is a railway station in the city of Chiryū, Aichi, Japan, operated by Meitetsu.

Lines
Mikawa Chiryū Station is served by the Meitetsu Mikawa Line and is 0.7 kilometers from the terminus of the line at Chiryū Station.

Station layout

The station has a single side platform and a single island platform, but only the island platform is in use. The platforms are connected by a level crossing The station has automated ticket machines, Manaca automated turnstiles and is staffed.

Platforms

Adjacent stations

|-
!colspan=5|Nagoya Railroad

Station history
The Aichi Electric Railway Company opened  nearby on April 1, 1922. The two stations merged later that year. The Aichi Electric Railway Company was taken over by Meitetsu on August 1, 1935 (becoming the Meitetsu Nagoya Main Line, and the Mikawa Railway on June 1, 1941. A new station building was completed later the same year. The station was renamed to its present name on April 1, 1959, with the completion of the third generation station building. Operations of the Nagoya Main Line were discontinued.

Passenger statistics
In fiscal 2017, the station was used by an average of 821 passengers daily (boarding passengers only).

Surrounding area
 Chiryū City Hall
 Chiryū High School

See also
 List of Railway Stations in Japan

References

External links

 Official web page 

Railway stations in Japan opened in 1915
Railway stations in Aichi Prefecture
Stations of Nagoya Railroad
Chiryū, Aichi